Rita Lee Jones (born 31 December 1947) is a Brazilian rock singer, composer and writer. She is a former member of the Brazilian band Os Mutantes and is a popular figure in Brazilian entertainment, where she is also known for being an animal rights activist and a vegan. She has sold more than 55 million records worldwide. Her autobiography Rita Lee: Uma Autobiografia was the best-selling non-fiction book of 2017 in Brazil.

Early life and education
Rita Lee was born in São Paulo, Brazil, to an American-Brazilian father, Charles Fenley Jones, a dentist descended from the Confederates, and Romilda Padula, a Brazilian mother of Italian ancestry and a pianist. Rita studied classical piano with the renowned pianist Magdalena Tagliaferro. In place of the traditional adolescent debut ball, she asked to receive a drum set.

She was educated in a French-language school and became fluent in Spanish, French, and Italian, as well as her native Portuguese and the English that her parents spoke at home. She went to college, with the popular actress Regina Duarte as one of her classmates, but she soon left to pursue her musical career.

Career 
In 1966, Lee formed the band Os Mutantes with Arnaldo Baptista and Sérgio Dias. The band released five albums between 1968 and 1972. In that time, Lee had also released her first two solo works, although these records were produced with fellow members of Os Mutantes. When the band reformed in 2006, she refused to join, calling the reunion an attempt to "earn cash to pay for geriatry".

Lee formed a band with two other friends, excelling at vocals so much that they backed stars such as Tony Campelo, Jet Blacks, Demetrius, and Prini Lopez, when they met the brothers Arnaldo and Sérgio Dias Baptista. Adopting the name O'Seis (a pun with "the six" and the Brazilian caipira way of saying "you all"), they recorded the single "O Suicida," which was never released. When the rest of the band left for college, only three of them remained. Picking the name Os Mutantes, they backed Nana Caymmi on her then-husband's composition "Bom Dia" (Gilberto Gil). When Gil met them, he immediately knew Os Mutantes were on the same track as the Baianos, and the band worked extensively with the members of the Tropicalia collective over the next two years, becoming an integral part of the movement. Gil Invited them to accompany him at TV Record's 1967 III Festival da MPB, where they performed Gil's "Domingo no Parque" with the addition of Rogério Duprat conducting an orchestra with his revolutionary arrangements. Gil's friend Caetano Veloso also performed with a rock group (São Paulo band Beat Boys), and although the novelty of electric instruments and the general irreverence of the mixing of western pop and strange orchestral sounds irritated some in the festival audience, both performances ultimately won approval, with Gil coming second and Veloso taking fourth place. Within a year, however, the nascent Tropicalia movement would face strident opposition from both the military junta that ruled Brazil at the time, and from Brazil's student left, who regarded the Tropicalistas' dalliance with Western pop as a sell-out. Soon after, Os Mutantes recorded their single "O Relógio".

In 1968, Os Mutantes performed on the album/manifesto Tropicália ou Panis et Circensis (Philips), with Nara Leão, Caetano Veloso, Gilberto Gil, Gal Costa, and Tom Zé. This was also when they recorded their first LP, Os Mutantes, and they also backed Gilerto Gil on his second self-titled solo album. In September 1968, Os Mutantes backed Caetano Veloso during his two notorious performances in TV Globo's Third International Song Festival in Rio. The ensemble was met with howls of disapproval from leftist students in the audience at their first-round appearance, due to their challenging psychedelic music, as well as Veloso's lurid costume, and his sexually provocative stage moves. The confrontation climaxed in the second round of the competition on 15 September, when Veloso performed his newly-written psychedelic protest song "É Proibido Proibir" ("It is Forbidden to Forbid"). Left-wing students in the audience (who were strongly opposed to the Tropicalismo experiment) loudly abused, booed and jeered the performers, and pelted the stage with fruit, vegetables and paper balls. A large group in audience showed their disapproval by turning their backs to the stage, prompting Lee and her bandmates to turn their backs on the audience, and Veloso responded angrily to the heckling, haranguing the students at length for their conservatism. The group also performed their "Caminhante Noturno", which won seventh place. In the same year, they participated at the IV FMPB with their "Dom Quixote" and, by Lee and Tom Zé, "2001". At the end of this year, they performed with the Baianos at the Sucata nightclub, Rio, and recorded their second album, also self-titled.

In 1969, following the arrests of Gil and Veloso, Os Mutantes went to Europe, playing at Cannes, France, at the MIDEM, and in Lisbon, Portugal. Then, they returned to Brazil and presented the show O Planeta dos Mutantes, the first multi-media experiment in Brazil. With bassist Liminha and drummer Dinho, they participated in the V FIC with "Ando Meio Desligado" (Arnaldo and Rita).

In 1970, Lee recorded her solo album, Build Up, produced by Arnaldo Baptista. Soon after, they had a stint at the Olympia in Paris. In that period, during their somewhat frequent tours in Europe, they recorded an LP that was never fully released, Tecnicolor, with the exception of some tracks included on 1971's Jardim Elétrico.  The LP, A Divina Comédia ou Ando Meio Desligado, is from that year and Jardim Elétrico (Polydor) from the next. In 1972, Lee recorded another solo album backed by Os Mutantes, Hoje É o Primeiro Dia do Resto da Sua Vida (Philips). After releasing the Mutantes e Seus Cometas no País do Baurets, Lee was ejected from the group by Arnaldo. Following a period of depression, during which she became locked up in her home,  she decided to abandon her career, but, at the same time, she was writing the material that would make her famous as a solo artist.

Going solo

Following her removal from Os Mutantes in late 1972, Lee started a solo career. She was initially part of a female duo with singer Lúcia Turnbull called Cilibrinas do Éden, and after a short time the duo met Lisergia, a band that would eventually become Lee's backing band with the name of Tutti Frutti. In 1974, the band recorded their first album Atrás do Porto Tem Uma Cidade (There is a City Behind the Harbor) that brought some great songs such as "Mamãe Natureza", "Menino Bonito", and "Pé de Meia". In 1975, she recorded the album Fruto Proibido with the band. The album was praised by critics, sold more than 200,000 copies –  a record to Brazilian rock and roll singers at the time – and Lee was given the title "Queen of Rock". In 2007, the Brazilian edition of Rolling Stone magazine ranked this album as the 16th-best Brazilian album of all time in its "100 Best List". The producer was Andy Mills, producer of Alice Cooper and then Lee's boyfriend.

In the late 1970s, Lee started a partnership with her husband, Roberto de Carvalho, and many subsequent albums were credited to the duo Lee/Carvalho. In the late 1970s, Lee was mentioned in the Caetano Veloso song, "Sampa".

In 1976, pregnant for the first time, she was arrested for possession of marijuana and condemned to one year of house imprisonment, when she composed with Paulo Coelho the single "Arrombou a Festa", which sold 200,000 copies. She continued to perform, under special judge permits. Soon after, she recorded the single "Doce de Pimenta" with singer Elis Regina, and recorded and toured with Gilberto Gil in the show/album Refestança.

In 1978, she released Babilônia, her fourth and last album with the band Tutti Frutti. The last work came after disagreements between members of the band.  The guitarist Luis Carlini left the band, taking the name Tutti Frutti with him. Rita and the rest of the band finished the tour under the name Rita Lee & Cães e Gatos. Lee started recording with her husband, Roberto de Carvalho. The couple wrote hits such as "Mania de Você" (1979), "Lança Perfume" (1980), "Saúde" (1981), "Flagra" (1982), and "On the Rocks" (1983).

Personal life
Lee was married to Mutante Arnaldo Baptista from 1968 to 1972. In 1976, MPB singer Ney Matogrosso introduced her to guitarist Roberto de Carvalho, whom she married, and they had three children: Beto Lee, João Lee, and Antônio. She has been married to Carvalho ever since and refers to him as her "boyfriend".

Other activities
Aside from her musical career, Lee had a humor program called Radio Amador on Brazilian radio for nine months in 1986. That same year, Lee wrote three children's books and appeared in Brazilian movies and TV shows. In 1990, she started her own talk show, called TvLeeZão (a play on "televisão", the Portuguese word for television), on MTV Brasil. From 2002 to 2004, she hosted the Brazilian cable TV talk show Saia Justa. In 2005, her husband and she started a new talk show, called Madame Lee. She also made a brief cameo in the 2002 film Durval Discos. In 2008–09, she performed a new show called Pic Nic Tour. In 2010, she performed another new show called Etc...Tour, revisiting some forgotten songs from her long career. In 2011, she began to produce and record two new albums. The first one has new unreleased songs, and the second one is called Bossa'n Movies where she continues the project started with Bossa'n Roll in 1991 and Bossa'n Beatles (Aqui, ali, em qualquer lugar).

In 2011, she contributed the track "Pistis Sophia" to the Red Hot Organization's most recent charitable album, Red Hot+Rio 2. The album was a follow-up to the 1996 Red Hot + Rio. Proceeds from the sales were donated to raise awareness and money to fight AIDS and related other health and social issues.

Discography

With Os Mutantes
1968: Tropicália: ou Panis et Circenses (Philips, 1968. Collective album with Gilberto Gil, Caetano Veloso, Tom Zé, Nara Leão and Gal Costa)
1968:  Os Mutantes (Polydor, 1968)
1969:  Mutantes (Polydor, 1969)
1970:  A Divina Comédia ou Ando Meio Desligado (Polydor, 1970)
1971:  Jardim Elétrico (Polydor, 1971)
1971:  Tecnicolor (abandoned, released 29 years later) (Universal, 2000)
1972:  Mutantes e Seus Cometas no País do Baurets (Polydor, 1972)

With Tutti Frutti
1974: Atrás do Porto Tem uma Cidade
1975: Fruto Proibido
1976: Entradas e Bandeiras
1978: Babilônia

Solo albums
1970: Build Up
1972: Hoje É o Primero Dia do Resto da Sua Vida (Cláudio César Dias Baptista talking and playing "zabumba")
1979: Rita Lee
1980: Rita Lee
1981: Saúde
1982: Rita Lee e Roberto de Carvalho
1983: Baila Conmigo (in Castilian)
1983: Bombom
1984: Rita Hits (two medleys remixed compilation)
1985: Rita e Roberto
1987: Flerte Fatal
1988: Zona Zen
1989: Dias Melhores Virão (soundtrack)
1990: Rita Lee e Roberto de Carvalho
1993: Todas as Mulheres do Mundo
1997: Santa Rita de Sampa
2000: 3001
2000: Rita ReLEEda (remixes)
2001: Aqui, Ali, Em Qualquer Lugar (aka Bossa'n Beatles)
2003: Balacobaco
2012: Reza

Live albums
1975: Hollywood Rock (with Erasmo Carlos, Peso & Raul Seixas)
1977: Refestança (with Gilberto Gil)
1991: Rita Lee em Bossa 'n' Roll
1995: A Marca Da Zorra
1998: Acústico MTV (MTV Unplugged)
2004: MTV Ao Vivo (MTV Live)
2009: Multishow Ao Vivo Rita Lee

Singles/EPs
1976: Lá Vou Eu (EP)
1977: Arrombou a Festa (Single)
1980: "Lanca Perfume" 
1983: Desculpe o Auê / Yoko Ono (Single in Spanish)
2002: Rita Lee Novelas

Spoken albums
1989: Pedro e o Lobo (spoken album as narrator to Peter and the Wolf)
1996: Tutu, O Menino Indio (spoken album as narrator)

Tributes
1996: Eles Cantam Rita Lee (Various Artists)
1996: Love, Lee Rita (by Ná Ozzetti)
2007: Pirataria-Rita Lee por Crikka Amorim (by Crikka Amorim)
2015: Prisioneira do Amor (by Andreia Dias)
2015: Rock Your Babies: Rita Lee (by Rock Your Babies)
2017: Baby, Baby (by Lulu Santos)
2020: Rita Lee: Eleectronica (by Jon Alkalay)

DVDs
1998: Acústico MTV (Live) (MTV Unplugged)
2004: MTV Ao Vivo (MTV Live)
2006: Grandes Nomes: Rita Lee Jones (Original TV Special From 1980)
2007: Biograffiti (Box Set 3 DVDs)
2009: Multishow Ao Vivo Rita Lee

Books 
1986: Dr. Alex
1988: Dr. Alex e os Reis de Angra
1990: Dr. Alex na Amazônia
1992: Dr. Alex e o Oráculo de Quartz
2013: Storynhas
2016: Rita Lee: Uma Autobiografia
2017: Dropz 
2018: favoRita 
2019: Amiga Ursa – Uma história triste, mas com final feliz

References

1947 births
Living people
Women rock singers
Música Popular Brasileira singers
Brazilian people of Italian descent
Brazilian people of American descent
Singers from São Paulo
Brazilian rock musicians
Brazilian mezzo-sopranos
Brazilian women composers
Brazilian composers
Tropicalia singers
Latin Grammy Award winners
Brazilian rock singers
21st-century Brazilian women singers
21st-century Brazilian singers
Women in Latin music
Latin Grammy Lifetime Achievement Award winners
Os Mutantes members